A speed demon is one who goes fast. Speed Demon may also refer to:

Culture

Fictional entities
 Speed Demon (comics), a supervillain in Marvel Comics
 Speed Demon (Amalgam Comics)
 Speed Demon (DC Comics)

Music
 "Speed Demon" (song), a 1989 song by Michael Jackson, from the album Bad
 "Speed Demon", a song by American band Keel from their album The Right to Rock
 "Speed Demon", a song by American band P.O.D. from their album The Awakening
 "Speed Demon", a song from U.D.O.'s 2009 album Dominator
 "Speed Demon", 2018 song by Greek musician Yanni

Films
 Speed Demon (1932 film), a 1932 Western film, directed by D. Ross Lederman
 Speed Demon (2003 film), a 2003 homoerotic horror film, directed by David Decoteau

See also